Zeldenrust is a smock mill in Zuidbarge, Drenthe, which has been restored to working order. The mill was built in 1857 and is listed as a Rijksmonument, number 14968.

History
Zeldenrust was built in 1857 for miller Roelf Oostling. It was moved from Emmen where it had been used as an oil mill. The mill passed from Roelf Oostling to his son Jans and in 1919 he sold it to Jan Omvlee, who died in 1928 on his 37th birthday, leaving a wife and eight children. The mill passed to his widow Jacoba. In 1936, the leading edges of the sails were streamlined on the Dekker system. In 1946, the mill was taken over by Harm and Johannes Omvlee but it ceased working in 1949. In 1966, the mill was restored by millwright Christiaan Bremer of Adorp, Groningen. New sails on the Fok system were fitted. On 13 November 1972 the mill was damaged in a storm. It was repaired in 1974. In 2001, the mill was sold to the Stichting Molen Zeldenrust. A further restoration was undertaken millwright Doornbosch. The cap and sails were removed on 22 September 2003. The new cap and sails were fitted to the mill on 5 April 2004 and the mill was officially reopened on 10 June 2006. The new sails have leading edges streamlined on the Fauël system.

Description

Zeldenrust is what the Dutch describe as an "achtkante stellingmolen". It is a three-storey smock mill on a three-storey brick base. The smock and cap are thatched. The mill is winded by a tailpole and winch. The windshaft also carries the brake wheel which has 64 cogs. This drives the wallower (33 cogs) at the top of the upright shaft. At the bottom of the upright shaft, the great spur wheel, which has 100 cogs, drives the  diameter French Burr stones via a lantern pinion stone nut with 33 staves.

Millers
Roelf Oostling (1857- )
Jans Oostling ( -1919)
Jan Omvlee (1919–28)
Jacoba Maria Omvlee-Bekhuis (1928–46)
Harm Omvlee (1946–49)
Johannes Omvlee (1946–49)

References for above:-

Public access
Zeldenrust is open to the public Monday to Friday from 09:00 to 18:00.

References

External links

Molen Zeldenrust website 

Windmills in Drenthe
Windmills completed in 1857
Smock mills in the Netherlands
Octagonal buildings in the Netherlands
1857 establishments in the Netherlands
Rijksmonuments in Drenthe
Buildings and structures in Emmen, Netherlands
19th-century architecture in the Netherlands